Renada-Laura Portet was the pen name of Renada-Laura Calmon-Ouillet (28 August 1927 – 5 September 2021) a Northern Catalonia writer and linguist of Occitania origin. She was one of the most important literary voices in Northern Catalonia. Portet cultivated the genres of poetry, short story, novel, drama, and essays, as well as scientific or research writing on topics such as linguistics, toponymy, or onomastics. She used several other pseudonyms including, "Caterina Martí", "Isabel Rosselló", "Vicenta Pallarès", "Toni Vidaló" and "Ramon Oliver".

Biography
Renada-Laura Calmon-Ouillet was born in Saint-Paul-de-Fenouillet, Pyrénées-Orientales, France, 28 August 1927.

She earned a degree in Romance Letters and Languages from the University of Montpellier. Portet's doctoral studies were in Romance philology.

Portet lived in exile in Algeria for four years and in Poitiers for twelve.

Portet worked as a high school and university teacher. This included her work in the Catalan program of the University of Trier (Germany) and West Virginia University (USA), and the French program of the University of Pennsylvania (USA).

Portet was the author of many poetry collections, in addition to a large number of books in prose, and short story collections. She produced at least two books focused on her specialization in toponymy and onomastic. She published stories and poems in local magazines as well as Catalan onomastic research articles. As a poet, short story writer, or novelist, she appeared in seven university anthologies in the United States, Italy, France, Catalonia, and Germany, such as Moderne katalanische Erzahlungen/Contes catalans moderns (Bonn: Romanistischer Verlag, 1988).

Death and legacy
In 1991, the filmmaker-author Robert Guisset made a literary film portrait entitled Renada'Song dedicated to the author.

Renada-Laura Calmon-Ouillet died in Elne, 5 September 2021.

Awards and honours

 1974, Prize, French Ministry of Culture
 1976, Natural Flower, at the Floral Games of the Catalan Language in Perpignan, for Poemes
 1978, Mantenidora en Llengua Catalana
 1980, Library of Catalonia award
 1981, Víctor Català award, for the collection of short stories Castell negrey. Later, the award was withdrawn, because Portet published the book in a French publishing house.
 1981, Vila de Perpinyà-Modest Sabaté, for Els noms de lloc del Rosselló
 1983, Finalist, Sant Jordi Prize, for the novel L'escletxa
 1988, Knight, Ordre des Palmes académiques
 1993, Maître d'Honneur, Ordre International des Anysetiers
 1988, Officer, Ordre des Palmes académiques
 1997,  Award
 1999, Commander, Orde de l’Estrella d’Or, Fundació Europea
 1999, Prix Majeur des Lettres
 2000, Silver medal, Orde de la Reine Violent, Vallbona de les Monges
 2002, Finalist, Josep Pla award, for Rigau & Rigaud. Un pintor a la cort de la rosa gratacul
 2004, Creu de Sant Jordi
 2004,  Short Story Award for the collection Una dona t'escriu
 2005, Prix Méditerranée-Roussillon
 2007, Premi de la rosa, for the whole of her work.
 2009, Premi Internacional de Literatura Antonio Machado
 2017, Coll de Manrella Memorial award, at the 39th Coll de Manrella Meeting
 2017, On the occasion of her 90th birthday, the Department of Culture of the Generalitat of Catalonia, the Institute of Catalan Studies, and the Institution of Catalan Letters paid tribute to his literary career and commitment.

Selected works

Poetry collections
 1990, Jocs de convit
 1992, Una ombra anomenada oblit
 1994, El cant de la Sibil·la
 2017,  N'hom

Short story collections
 2004, Una dona t'escriu

Prose
 1981, Castell negre
 1983, L'escletxa
 2002, Rigau & Rigaud

Non-fiction
 1981, Els noms de lloc del Rosselló
 1983, Toponímia rossellonesa

References

1927 births
2021 deaths
People from Pyrénées-Orientales
Catalan-language writers
20th-century pseudonymous writers
Pseudonymous women writers